Hairdryer Peace is the 2008 third and final album by The Hospitals, initially released on vinyl. It was named one of the 2008 records of the year by The Wire magazine. A CD release followed in 2009.

Track listing
All songs by Adam Stonehouse.

Side one
"Hairdryer Peace" 		
"Getting Out of Bed" 		
"Rules for Being Alive" 		
"Ape Lost" 
"This Walls" 
"Sour Hawaii" 
"Smeared Thinking" 
Side two		
"Tears" 		
"Animals Act Natural" 		
"Me, a Ceiling Fan" 		
"BPPV" 		
"Dream Damage" 		
"Scan the Floor for Food"
"Don't Die"

Personnel
Adam Stonehouse – vocals, drums, guitar, keyboards
Chris Gunn – guitar, backing vocals
Rod Meyer – guitar
Rob Enbom – bass

References

2008 albums
The Hospitals albums